The Little Apocalypse can refer to:

 The Little Apocalypse (1993 film), a French film
 The Little Apocalypse (2006 film), a Turkish film
 The Olivet discourse, a passage in the synoptic Gospels where Jesus is depicted describing the end times